Ghajini may refer to:
 Ghajini (2005 film), a Tamil film starring Surya Sivakumar and Asin, by A. R. Murugadoss
 Ghajini (2008 film), a Hindi remake of the Tamil film
 Ghajini – The Game, 2008 third-person action game based on the 2008 film Ghajini
 Mahmud of Ghazni, whose name Ghazni is pronounced "Ghajini" in Tamil

See also
Ghajinikanth, a 2018 Indian Tamil film